Darkapey (also Romanized as Darkāpey) is a village in Pain Khiyaban-e Litkuh Rural District, in the Central District of Amol County, Mazandaran Province, Iran. At the 2016 census, its population was 190, in 60 families.

References 

Populated places in Amol County